Pseudaletis antimachus is a butterfly in the family Lycaenidae. It is found in Sierra Leone, Nigeria, Cameroon, Gabon, the Republic of the Congo, the Central African Republic, the Democratic Republic of the Congo, Uganda and Tanzania.

References

External links
Die Gross-Schmetterlinge der Erde 13: Die Afrikanischen Tagfalter. Plate XIII 66 g

Butterflies described in 1888
Pseudaletis
Butterflies of Africa
Taxa named by Otto Staudinger